The following is the complete filmography of Mexican filmmaker and author Guillermo del Toro.

Film

Television

Video games

Acting roles

Other works

References 

 
Director filmographies
Male actor filmographies
Mexican filmographies